Andrija Katić (born 17 February 2002) is a Serbian footballer, who plays as a goalkeeper for Voždovac.

Club career

Jagodina
Born in Kruševac, Katić was a member of the Trstenik PPT academy, formed in the structure of Prva Petoletka industry. Later he moved to the Jagodina's youth system, passing all categories with the club, usually playing with older generation. Katić joined the first squad in second half of the 2017–18 Serbian First League campaign as a third choice, behind Stefan Stojanović and Aleksa Milojević. At the age of 16 years and 57 days, Katić made his professional debut as a goalkeeper replacing Stefan Stojanović in 86th minute of the match against Sloboda Užice on 15 April 2018. In the next fixture match, against Temnić, Katić also joined the game in second half. Finally, Katić played full-time match against ČSK Čelarevo in the last fixture match of the 2017–18 campaign on 31 May 2018.

Career statistics

Club

Honours

Red Star Belgrade
 Serbian SuperLiga: 2019–20

References

2002 births
Living people
Sportspeople from Kruševac
Association football goalkeepers
Serbian footballers
FK Jagodina players
FK IMT players
Serbian First League players
21st-century Serbian people
Serbia under-21 international footballers